Annie Mary Youngman (25 February 1859 – 10 January 1919) was a British painter.

Biography
Youngman was born in Saffron Walden as the daughter of the painter-etcher John Mallows Youngman, who made etchings for a book called Sketches of Saffron Walden. Youngman exhibited her work at the Palace of Fine Arts at the 1893 World's Columbian Exposition in Chicago, Illinois.

Her paintings From a Neopolitan Villa and Who Loves a Garden Loves a Greenhouse too were included in the 1905 book Women Painters of the World. She was posthumously made a member of the Royal Institute of Painters in Water Colours in 1919.

Gallery

References 

1859 births
1919 deaths
19th-century English painters
19th-century English women artists
20th-century English painters
20th-century English women artists
English women painters
People from Saffron Walden